Mordellistena majorina is a species of beetles is the family Mordellidae.

References

majorina
Beetles described in 1854